Thondapi is a village in palnadu district of the Indian state of Andhra Pradesh. It is located in Muppalla mandal of sattenapalli revenue division.

Geography 

Governance 

Thondapi gram panchayat is the local self-government of the village. It is divided into wards and each ward is represented by a ward member.

Education 

As per the school information report for the academic year 2018–19, the village has 3 MPP schools.

See also 
List of villages in palnadu district

References 

Villages in Guntur district